Serafino (also known as Serafino ou L'amour aux champs in France) is a 1968 Italian film directed by Pietro Germi.

Plot
Serafino is a nature-boy who never attended school. He relishes the simple life as a shepherd in the mountains of Italy in Arquata del Tronto, Marche. When he is called up but as a soldier and has to serve in a big city, he is a troublemaker and eventually the military decides to send him home early.

When he returns home he discovers that his cousin Lidia has become an attractive woman. He neglects his old friend Asmara, the local hooker, and starts a secret love affair with Lidia. But when their old aunt Gesuina dies, Lidia acts as greedy as her whole family and Serafino openly resents that. To everybody's surprise Gesuina has chosen Serafino as her heir. Serafino doesn't hesitate to squander the money with his friends, buying them gifts and a brand new convertible for himself. When the car gets stuck in a pothole, Serafino and his friends try to push it out, ending up with the driverless car barreling down into a ravine and destroying it. This is unbearable for his uncle Agenore (Lidia's father) who therefore decides to file a petition to have Serafino declared mentally incompetent.

At court Serafino tries to defend himself. He doesn't take the matter seriously and gloats about the fact that even the military couldn't deal with him either. In the end the judge decides against him. Even so, Agenore cannot get hold of Serafino's money. Yet he learns that Serafino can still marry and then his wife would be his legal guardian and thus allowed to manage his estate at will. Later he tries to force Serafino into marrying Lidia. But again Serafino pretends to be too dumb to comply and once again this ploy is successful. In the end he marries Asmara and returns to his work as a shepherd.

Cast
 Adriano Celentano: Serafino
 Saro Urzì: Uncle Agenore
 Francesca Romana Coluzzi: Asmara
 Ottavia Piccolo: Lidia
 Amedeo Trilli: Pasquale
 Nerina Montagnani: Aunt Gesuina
 Benjamin Lev: Armido
 Nazzareno Natale: Silio

Awards
 Golden Prize at the 6th Moscow International Film Festival in 1969.

References

External links

1968 films
Italian comedy-drama films
1960s Italian-language films
1968 comedy-drama films
Films directed by Pietro Germi
Films produced by Angelo Rizzoli
Films scored by Carlo Rustichelli
Films shot in Abruzzo
1960s Italian films